The 2013–14 season was Sivasspor ninth consecutive season in the Süper Lig, and their 46th season. They finished the season in Fifth place in the Süper Lig and were knocked out of the Turkish Cup at the group stage.

Squad

Out on loan

Transfers

Summer

In:

Out:

Winter

In:

Out:

Competitions

Süper Lig

Results

League table

Turkish Cup

First stage

Group stage

Squad statistics

Appearances and goals

|-
|colspan="14"|Players away from the club on loan :

|-
|colspan="14"|Players who appeared for Sivasspor no longer at the club:

|}

Goal scorers

Disciplinary Record

References

Sivasspor seasons
Sivasspor